The following is a complete list of chamber music by Christoph Graupner (1683-1760), the German harpsichordist and composer of high Baroque music.  The works appear as given in Christoph Graupner : Thematisches Verzeichnis der musikalischen Werke (thematic catalogue of Graupner's instrumental works).

List of chamber pieces
Gwv 201 — Trio for bassoon, chalumeau & continuo in C major
Gwv 202 — Trio for flute, viola d'amore & continuo in C major
Gwv 203 — Trio for 2 violins & continuo in C minor
Gwv 204 — Trio for 2 violins & continuo in D major
Gwv 205 — Trio for flute, viola d'amore & continuo in D major
Gwv 206 — Sonata for 2 horns, violin, viola & continuo in D major
Gwv 207 — Trio for flute, viola d'amore & continuo in D minor
Gwv 208 — Trio for 2 violins & continuo in E major
Gwv 209 — Trio for flute, viola d'amore & continuo in E minor
Gwv 210 — Trio for viola d'amore, chalumeau & continuo in F major
Gwv 211 — Trio for 2 violins & continuo in F major
Gwv 212 — Sonata for 2 violins, viola & continuo in G major
Gwv 213 — Sonata for 2 horns, violin, viola & continuo in G major
Gwv 214 — Sonata for 2 horns, violin, viola & continuo in G major
Gwv 215 — Trio for 2 violins & continuo in G minor
Gwv 216 — Sonata for 2 recorders, viola da gamba & continuo in G minor
Gwv 217 — Trio for flute, viola d'amore & continuo in B flat major
Gwv 218 — Sonata for 2 oboes, viola da gamba & continuo in B flat major
Gwv 219 — Trio for flute, violin & continuo in B minor
Gwv 707 — Flute Sonata in G major
Gwv 708 — Violin Sonata in G major
Gwv 709 — Violin Sonata in G minor
Gwv 710 — Violin Sonata in G minor
Gwv 711 — Violin Sonata in G minor
Gwv 712 — Trio for 2 violins & continuo No. 1 in B flat major
Gwv 713 — Trio for 2 violins & continuo No. 2 in G major
Gwv 714 — Trio for 2 violins & continuo No. 3 in D major
Gwv 715 — Trio for 2 violins & continuo No. 4 in A minor
Gwv 716 — Trio for 2 violins & continuo No. 5 in C minor
Gwv 717 — Trio for 2 violins & continuo No. 6 in A major
Gwv 718 — Trio for 2 violins & continuo No. 7 in D minor
Gwv 719 — Trio for 2 violins & continuo No. 8 in G minor
Gwv 720 — Trio for 2 violins & continuo No. 9 in F major
Gwv 721 — Trio for 2 violins & continuo No.10 in C major
Gwv 722 — Trio for 2 violins & continuo No.11 in B minor
Gwv 723 — Trio for 2 violins & continuo No.12 in E minor
Gwv 724 — Sonata for 2 violins, viola & continuo in G minor

See also
 List of cantatas by Christoph Graupner
 List of symphonies by Christoph Graupner
 List of harpsichord pieces by Christoph Graupner
 List of orchestral suites by Christoph Graupner
 List of concertos by Christoph Graupner

Selected discography
 Die Kunst der Imitation. Works by Graupner, Fasch & Molter. Antichi Strumenti, ensemble. (Stradivarius 33632)

References

External links
The Christoph Graupner Society Homepage
Extensive online bibliography for research on Christoph Graupner
ULB Library  Graupner's music manuscripts and archives in Darmstadt, Germany
Kim Patrick Clow's webpage dedicated to promoting Graupner's work.

 Christoph Graupner's works at La Sinfonie d'Orphée

Chamber pieces
Chamber music by Christoph Graupner